The 2007 BA-CA-TennisTrophy was a tennis tournament played on indoor hard courts. It was the 33rd edition of the event known that year as the BA-CA-TennisTrophy, and was part of the International Series Gold of the 2007 ATP Tour. It took place at the Wiener Stadthalle in Vienna, Austria, from 7 October through 14 October 2007.

The singles featured ATP No. 3, US Open runner-up, Miami and Canada Masters, Adelaide and Estoril winner Novak Djokovic, Australian Open and Rome Masters finalist, Beijing winner Fernando González, and Doha, 's-Hertogenbosch titlist Ivan Ljubičić. Also lined up were Wimbledon semifinalist, Mumbai winner Richard Gasquet, Costa do Sauípe titlist Guillermo Cañas, Carlos Moyá, Juan Ignacio Chela and Marcos Baghdatis.

Finals

Singles

 Novak Djokovic defeated  Stanislas Wawrinka 6–4, 6–0
It was Novak Djokovic's 5th title of the year, and his 7th overall.

Doubles

 Mariusz Fyrstenberg /  Marcin Matkowski defeated  Tomas Behrend /  Christopher Kas 6–4, 6–2

References

External links
 Official website
 ATP tournament profile
 Singles draw
 Doubles draw
 Qualifying Singles draw